Patrick John Pelly (12 November 1877 – 20 February 1939) was an Australian rules footballer who played with Carlton in the Victorian Football League (VFL).

References

External links 

Pat Pelly's profile at Blueseum

1877 births
1939 deaths
Australian rules footballers from Victoria (Australia)
Carlton Football Club players